HD 168443 is an ordinary yellow-hued star in the Serpens Cauda segment of the equatorial constellation of Serpens. It is known to have two substellar companions. With an apparent visual magnitude of 6.92, the star lies just below the nominal lower brightness limit of visibility to the normal human eye. This system is located at a distance of 127 light years from the Sun based on parallax, but is drifting closer with a radial velocity of −48.7 km/s.

This stellar object is a core hydrogen fusing G-type main-sequence star with a classification of G6V, although it is likely evolved with an age of around 11 billion years. It is slightly lower in mass than the Sun but has a radius that is larger by 51%. The star is spinning with a leisurely projected rotational velocity of 2.2 km/s and it has a very inactive chromosphere. It is radiating 2.4 times the luminosity of the Sun from its photosphere at an effective temperature of 5,491 K.

HD 168443 is known to be orbited by a super-Jupiter exoplanet, discovered in 1999, and a brown dwarf, discovered in 2001. The brown dwarf takes 30 times longer to orbit the star than the planet. Both have eccentric orbits. Test simulations of massless particles orbiting in between these two bodies show that all such objects are quickly ejected within two million years. That suggests any other planetary companions would be orbiting further out from the star.

See also
 HD 38529
 List of extrasolar planets

References

External links
 
 

G-type main-sequence stars
Brown dwarfs
Planetary systems with two confirmed planets

Serpens (constellation)
Durchmusterung objects
4052
168443
089844